Morrisville is a borough in Bucks County, Pennsylvania, United States. It is located just below the falls of the Delaware River opposite Trenton, New Jersey.  The population was 8,728 at the 2010 census.

History
The earliest known settlement in what is now Morrisville, was a trading post of the Dutch West India Company operating from 1624 to 1627 on an island in the Delaware River. In its early days, the area was known as Crewcorne and was a part of Falls Township. Later, one of the first ferries to cross the Delaware was established at the site. By the late 18th century, a settlement was forming at the ferry crossing then known as Colvin's Ferry. The settlement incorporated into a borough in 1804, taking the name of Morrisville, after Founding Father Robert Morris. In that same year, the first bridge built across the Delaware connected Morrisville to Trenton.

The Gershom Craft House, Summerseat, and Trenton City/Calhoun Street Bridge are listed on the National Register of Historic Places.  Summerseat is also designated a National Historic Landmark.

Morrisville is also home to Graystones, the historic site marking William Penn's first Pennsylvania land purchase from the Lenni Lenape Indians.

Morrisville was once considered for the Nation's Capital. Robert Morris campaigned behind the scenes to establish the new capital at the “Falls of the Delaware,” preferably on the Pennsylvania side. Today that is seen from Park Avenue in Morrisville, just atop of the 30-foot tall flood control dike. The Delaware River is viewed from here and just below is the famous Falls of the Delaware, for which Falls Township was named.

Geography
Morrisville is located at  (40.207458, -74.779918). It is part of a geographical salient that is mostly surrounded by New Jersey.

Originally a village located in Falls Township, until it was partitioned as a borough by the Pennsylvania Legislature in 1804, Morrisville is bordered by Falls Township to the south, Lower Makefield Township to the north and the Delaware River to the east.

Its name is the default city name in the 19067 ZIP code, which covers an area that includes Yardley, Lower Makefield, Morrisville, and part of Falls Township.

According to the United States Census Bureau, the borough has a total area of 2.0 square miles (5.1 km2), of which 1.8 square miles (4.6 km2) is land and 0.2 square mile (0.5 km2) (10.15%) is water. 

There are several parks within Morrisville's borders, and the Delaware Canal State Park runs near the eastern border of both the town and Pennsylvania. Located between the Calhoun Street Bridge and the Lower Trenton Bridge (Trenton Makes) is Williamson Park, home to Morrisville Little League and many community events. Adjacent to Graystones is Graystones woods, a tract of woodland that extends from the Delaware Canal to Crown Street in the town's far north. Just south of the Trenton–Morrisville Toll Bridge and the Morrisville–Trenton Railroad Bridge lie two smaller parks, the Morrisville Riverfront Preserve, an 8.8-acre tract preserving some of the last bits of the Delaware River's tidal basin, and the Morrisville Dog Park, a two pen playground for dogs big and small.

Demographics

As of a 2014 estimate, the borough was 58.5% Non-Hispanic White, 25.9% Black or African American, 2.4% Native American or Alaskan Native, 2.2% Asian, 4.4% Some other race, and 6.5% were two or more races. 16.4% of the population were of Hispanic or Latino ancestry.

As of the 2010 census, the borough was 70.6% Non-Hispanic White, 15.4% Black or African American, 0.3% Native American, 2.0% Asian, and 2.7% were two or more races. 10.2% of the population were of Hispanic or Latino ancestry. 13.5% of the population were foreign-born.

As of the census of 2000, there were 10,023 people, 4,154 households, and 2,612 families residing in the borough. The population density was 5,659.0 people per square mile (2,186.4/km2). There were 4,313 housing units at an average density of 2,435.1/sq mi (940.8/km2). The racial makeup of the borough was 75.98% White, 19.14% African American, 0.18% Native American, 1.20% Asian, 2.08% from other races, and 1.44% from two or more races. Hispanic or Latino of any race were 4.82% of the population.

There were 4,154 households, out of which 38.5% had children under the age of 18 living with them, 42.7% were married couples living together, 15.0% had a female householder with no husband present, and 37.1% were non-families. 30.0% of all households were made up of individuals, and 10.1% had someone living alone who was 65 years of age or older. The average household size was 2.41 and the average family size was 3.01.

In the borough the population was spread out, with 24.7% under the age of 18, 7.9% from 18 to 24, 34.3% from 25 to 44, 21.1% from 45 to 64, and 12.0% who were 65 years of age or older. The median age was 36 years. For every 100 females, there were 91.6 males. For every 100 females age 18 and over, there were 88.7 males.

The median income for a household in the borough was $43,095, and the median income for a family was $53,316. Males had a median income of $40,204 versus $30,110 for females. The per capita income for the borough was $21,404. About 8.9% of families and 10.0% of the population were below the poverty line, including 12.1% of those under age 18 and 8.8% of those age 65 or over.

Education
The local school district is the Morrisville School District.

Etymology

The borough is named for American Founding Father, Pennsylvania merchant, and banker Robert Morris, the main financier of the American Revolution.  His home Summerseat still stands in town.

Sports 
In 1955, the Morrisville Little League baseball team defeated Merchantville, New Jersey to claim the Little League World Series title. It is one of four Pennsylvania teams to have won the tournament since its inception in 1947.

Transportation

U.S. Route 1 is the primary highway serving Morrisville. It follows a southwest-northeast alignment across the southeastern portion of the borough, crossing the Delaware River into New Jersey via the Trenton–Morrisville Toll Bridge. Pennsylvania Route 32 also traverses the borough, following a north-south alignment via Bridge Street, Delmorr Avenue and River Road.

SEPTA provides Suburban Bus service to Morrisville along Route 127, which runs between the Oxford Valley Mall near Langhorne and the Trenton Transit Center in Trenton, New Jersey. Amtrak's Northeast Corridor and SEPTA Regional Rail's Trenton Line pass through the borough but do not have any stations within it; the nearest station serving Amtrak and SEPTA Regional Rail is the Trenton Transit Center, which also serves NJ Transit's Northeast Corridor Line, River Line, and bus routes.

Climate

According to the Köppen climate classification system, Morrisville has a Humid subtropical climate (Cfa). Cfa climates are characterized by all months having an average mean temperature > , at least four months with an average mean temperature ≥ , at least one month with an average mean temperature ≥  and no significant precipitation difference between seasons. This immediately borders a humid subtropical climate (Cfa) as found in Falls Township. Although most summer days are slightly humid in Morrisville, episodes of heat and high humidity can occur with heat index values > . The average wettest month is July, which corresponds with the annual peak in thunderstorm activity. Episodes of extreme cold and wind can occur, with wind chill values < . Ice storms and large snowstorms depositing ≥  of snow occur once every few years, particularly during nor’easters from

Ecology

According to the A. W. Kuchler U.S. potential natural vegetation types, Morrisville would have a dominant vegetation type of Appalachian Oak (104) with a dominant vegetation form of Eastern Hardwood Forest (25). The spring bloom typically begins by April 8 and fall color usually peaks by November 3.

Notable people
Morrisville is the birthplace or home to a number of well-known Americans, including:
 Thomas Barclay, America' first consul in France
 George Clymer, politician, signer of the Declaration of Independence and Constitution and Founding Father of The United States
 Willard Curtin, member of the U.S. House of Representatives
 Tony DiStefano, former motocross national champion
 Thomas Mortimer Fowler, prolific panoramic mapmaker of the 19th century.
 Dick Hart, former football player for the Philadelphia Eagles and Buffalo Bills.
 Thomas Story Kirkbride, physician and founder of the Association of Medical Superintendents of American Institutions for the Insane, which would become the American Psychiatric Association
 Michael Lenox, American strategist.
 T. Norman Mansell, architect.
 Jean Victor Marie Moreau, 18/19th century French General.
 Robert Morris, financier of the American Revolution and signer of the Declaration of Independence, the Articles of Confederation, and the Constitution.
 Danny Napoleon, professional baseball player for the New York Mets
 Asher Roth, rapper.
 James Floyd Smith inventor and aviation pioneer.
 Charles Tart, psychologist and parapsychologist.
 Mike Vreeswyk, NCAA Hall of Fame basketball player for the Temple Owls

See also
 Morrisville Middle/Senior High School

References

External links

 Morrisville Business Association official website

Populated places established in 1798
Boroughs in Bucks County, Pennsylvania
Pennsylvania populated places on the Delaware River